Neurodivergentes is a journalistic-academic book by Brazilian author Sophia Mendonça. Released in 2019, the book became a reference among works that address autism and neurodiversity in the media context.

Book's Overview 
The focus of the book is the most current issues about autism in contemporary times. So, there are themes like autistic people and empathy, the causes of autism, the imagination of autistic people, how the media sees autistic people, for example. Thus, the author interviewed both autistic people and professionals, as well as family members of autistic people, with the criterion that they were people who had an avant-garde vision, while being guided by scientific evidence.

Neurodivergentes' seeks to understand the functioning of the autistic brain and the relationship with the surrounding world, with regard to the central characteristics of ASD, but focusing on the nuances that make each autistic person unique. The book features interviews with renowned researchers, such as Maria Luísa Nogueira and Jeane Mendes, both from the Federal University of Minas Gerais, and psychiatrist Raquel Del Monde. It also features interviews with Brazilian autistic people, such as cartoonist Rodrigo Tramonte and activists Amanda Paschoal and Fernanda Santana, who at the time was president of ABRAÇA – Brazilian Association for Action for the Rights of Autistic People. The book defends autism not as a disease, but as a variation of brain connectivity and it is divided into three chapters: “Intelligence and Neurodiversity”, “Female Autism” and “Media”. 

In the chapter on autism in women, Mendonça presents studies showing that even in neurotypical people, and also in autistic people, there is a neurological difference between men and women that makes women more attentive to the reactions of people in the environment. There is also a cultural issue that demands more from women symbolic games and modeling and even friends who correct socially inconvenient behavior. This analysis led the author to conclude that autistic women, in general, mask this condition better than men with the same diagnosis.  She expanded her studies on the relationship between autism and gender with the book Metamorfoses, from 2023.

References 

2019 non-fiction books
Brazilian non-fiction books
Books about autism
Books about autistic women
Books by Sophia Mendonça